Spin-orbital may mean:

Spin-orbital, a type of orbital
Spin (orbital), a movement of an orbital
Spin (physics), a physics term